The Qinglongshan–Fuyang railway is a passenger and freight railway line in China. Its southern terminus is Fuyang which is on the Beijing–Kowloon railway, Luohe–Fuyang railway, and Fuyang–Huainan railway. The northern terminus is Qinglongshan, a freight-only station on the Fuliji–Jiahezhai railway.

History
The line opened in July 1970 and was built primarily for the transportation of coal.

The section between Tianqimiao and Qingting was double-tracked between November 2006 and April 2007. The whole line is now double-track.

Electrification of the line began in April 2015 and was completed in January 2019.

References

Railway lines in China
Railway lines opened in 1970